Baby2Baby is an American 501(c)(3) nonprofit organization which provides diapers, clothes and other necessities for children in poverty in the Los Angeles area and in disaster areas across the country. It has support from show-business personalities: a 2018 gala dinner raised $4million. In last 10 years, Baby2Baby has donated over 200 million items to the children in need which includes foster care, disaster victims, homeless and more.

Baby2Baby leads the Baby2Baby National Network, which works with local organizations to "distribute basic essentials to children living in poverty in over 40 cities across the United States."

It is one of the four charities to which the Duke and Duchess of Sussex suggested people might donate instead of sending gifts for their newborn son Archie in 2019.

References

External links

 Interview video

Children's charities based in the United States
Charities based in California
Non-profit organizations based in Los Angeles

501(c)(3) organizations